Seo-yeon also spelled Seo-yun or Seo-yon, is a Korean feminine given name. The meaning differs based on the hanja used to write each syllable of the name. There are 53 hanja with the reading "seo" and 56 hanja with the reading "yeon" on the South Korean government's official list of hanja which may be registered for use in given names. Seo-yeon was the 1st-most popular name for baby girls in South Korea in 2008, 2009, 2011, 2013, 2nd-most popular name in 2015 and 3rd-most popular name in 2017.

People
People with this name include:
Shim Seo-yeon (born 1989), South Korean football defender
Ji Seo-yeon (born 2005), South Korean figure skater

Fictional characters
Fictional characters with this name include:

Kim Seo-yeon, in 2009 South Korean television series Cain and Abel
Lee Seo-yeon, in 2011 South Korean television series A Thousand Days' Promise
Yang Seo-yeon, in 2012 South Korean film Architecture 101
Jin Seo-yeon, antagonist in Korean MMORPG Blade & Soul

See also
List of Korean given names

References

Korean feminine given names